Love Letter is a 1975 Indian Malayalam film,  directed and produced by Dr. Balakrishnan. The film stars Vincent, Sudheer, Vidhubala, Jose Prakash, Manavalan Joseph, KPAC Lalitha and Pattom Sadan in the lead roles. The film has musical score by KJ Joy. And this was his very first film as a composer which kick started his illustrious career as a leading music director in Malayalam.

Cast

Vincent
Sudheer
Jose Prakash
Vidhubala
Reena
KPAC Lalitha
Manavalan Joseph
Pattom Sadan
Sankaradi
Surasu
T. R. Omana
Khadeeja
Kuthiravattam Pappu
Cochin Haneefa
Nilambur Balan
Janardanan
Kaduvakulam Antony
Mallika Sukumaran
Paravoor Bharathan
T. P. Madhavan
Unni
Ramdas
K. R. Suresh
Balanujan
C. R. Lakshmi
Devanath
Karunan
Lissy
Mangad Balakrishnan
Marykutty
Parvathi
Sajeev
Swapna
Treesa
Vasu

Soundtrack
The music was composed by K. J. Joy and the lyrics were written by Sathyan Anthikkad and Bharanikkavu Sivakumar.

References

External links
 

1975 films
1970s Malayalam-language films